Otto Bresling (11 January 1921 – 17 July 2009) was a Danish footballer. He played in one match for the Denmark national football team in 1940.

References

External links
 

1921 births
2009 deaths
Danish men's footballers
Denmark international footballers
Footballers from Copenhagen
Association football midfielders
Boldklubben 1903 players